Zarinae Sapong (born 27 January 1998) is a sprinter from the Northern Mariana Islands. She represented her country at three outdoor and two indoor World Championships.

Sapong competed at the 2022 World Athletics Championships in Eugene, Oregon. She ran a sub 13-second personal best but did not progress to the next round.

International competitions

Personal bests
Outdoor
100 metres – 12.98 (+0.1 m/s, Eugene 2022)
200 metres – 27.40 (-0.7 m/s, Apia 2019)
Indoor
60 metres – 8.54 (Birmingham 2018)

References

1998 births
Living people
Northern Mariana Islands female sprinters
World Athletics Championships athletes for the Northern Mariana Islands
21st-century American women